Lars Aage Ylander (12 August 1928 – 16 November 2010) was a Swedish sprinter who specialized in the 400 m hurdles. In this event he won the national title in 1952 and 1953 and finished fifth at the 1950 European Athletics Championships, but failed to reach the final at the 1952 Summer Olympics.

References

1929 births
2010 deaths
Swedish male hurdlers
Olympic athletes of Sweden
Athletes (track and field) at the 1952 Summer Olympics
Sportspeople from Uppsala